Washington/Wells is a station on the Chicago "L" system, located in downtown Chicago, Illinois on The Loop.  The station opened on July 17, 1995.  Washington/Wells is located a few blocks from several major attractions and business centers, such as Chicago City Hall, the Civic Opera House, and the Chicago Mercantile Exchange. The station is also three blocks east of Ogilvie Transportation Center, terminal for the Union Pacific North, Northwest, and West line Metra trains. The station is located between Washington and Madison on Wells Street in downtown Chicago.

History
The Washington/Wells station replaced two former Loop stations, Randolph/Wells and Madison/Wells. The CTA did the same on the Wabash side of the Loop, replacing Randolph/Wabash and Madison/Wabash with Washington/Wabash.

Station layout
A large mezzanine is accessible by stairs just south of Washington on either side of Wells, and the station is also accessible via elevators. Just past several turnstiles are stairwells leading to the platform level; the easternmost stairs go to the Inner Loop platform while the westernmost go to the Outer Loop platform. Both platforms are also serviced by elevators. It is possible to go from one platform to the other without leaving the paid area, making Washington/Wells a transfer station. The platforms are from Washington to Madison; the platforms continues over Madison Street. There are auxiliary exits on both ends of both platforms to the east sides of Washington and Madison. Both platforms can handle eight-car trains, the longest on the CTA system.

Service
Washington/Wells serves the Brown Line (which travels counterclockwise on the Outer Loop track), and the Orange Line, Purple Line Express (weekday rush hours only), and Pink Line (which travel clockwise on the Inner Loop track).

Bus connections
CTA
  J14 Jeffery Jump 
  20 Madison (Owl Service) 
  37 Sedgwick (Weekdays only)
  56 Milwaukee 
  60 Blue Island/26th (Owl Service) 
  124 Navy Pier 
  157 Streeterville/Taylor (Weekdays only)

References

External links 

Washington/Wells Station Page at Chicago-'L'.org
Brown Line Train schedules at CTA official site
Orange Line Train schedules at CTA official site
Purple Line Train schedules at CTA official site
Pink Line Train schedules at CTA official site
Washington Street entrance from Google Maps Street View
Madison Street closed entrance from Google Maps Street View

CTA Brown Line stations
CTA Orange Line stations
CTA Purple Line stations
CTA Pink Line stations
Historic American Engineering Record in Chicago
Railway stations in the United States opened in 1995